Acacia tarculensis, commonly known as granite wattle, granite bush or steel bush is a shrub belonging to the genus Acacia and the subgenus Juliflorae that is native to south central Australia.

Description
Like most species of Acacia it has phyllodes rather than true leaves. The phyllodes have golden or silvery hairs when young and have many narrow parallel nerves with one to three nerves that are slightly more prominent than others. It blooms between May and August but sometimes flowers at other times following rain events. The simple inflorescences are found singly or in pairs in the axils. The velvety and subwoody seed pods that form after flowering have a narrowly oblong shape and are barely raised over the seeds.

Taxonomy
The species was first formally described by the botanist John McConnell Black in 1912 in the work Transactions and proceedings of the Royal Society of South Australia. It was reclassified in 2003 by Leslie Pedley as Racosperma tarculense and then transferred back to the Acacia genus in 2006. The specific epithet is derived from the town of Tarcoola from where the type specimen was collected by J.W.Mellor in 1912.

Distribution
It is endemic to southern parts of central South Australia from the northern parts of the Eyre Peninsula in the south to around areas to the west of the Gawler Range and to just north of Tarcoola where it is usually situated on rocky hillsides and ridges that are composed of granite as a part of open and tall shrubland or low woodland communities.

See also
List of Acacia species

References

tarculensis
Flora of South Australia
Plants described in 1912
Taxa named by John McConnell Black